Botanical gardens in Slovakia have collections consisting entirely of Slovakia native and endemic species; most have a collection that include plants from around the world. There are botanical gardens and arboreta in all states and territories of Slovakia, most are administered by local governments, some are privately owned.
 Botanical Garden of the Comenius University
 Botanická zahrada (Banská Štiavnica)
 Botanická záhrada Univerzity P.J. Šafárika (Košice)
 Botanická záhrada pri SPU v Nitre
 Lesnícke arborétum Kysihýbel, Banská Štiavnica
 Arborétum Mlyňany SAV, Tesárske Mlyňany
 Arborétum Borová hora, Zvolen, miestna časť Borová hora 
 Arborétum Liptovský Hrádok, Liptovský Hrádok

References 

Slovakia
Botanical gardens